"Google: Behind the Screen" is a 51-minute episode of the documentary television series Backlight about Google. The episode was first broadcast on 7 May 2006 by VPRO on Nederland 3. It was directed by IJsbrand van Veelen, produced by Nicoline Tania, and edited by Doke Romeijn and Frank Wiering.

References

External links 
 "Google: Achter het scherm" (in Dutch) at the Backlight website
 

Documentary films about Google
Dutch documentary films